Willow Brook may refer to:

Willow Brook (Otsego Lake tributary), a creek in New York
Willow Brook (River Nene), Northamptonshire, England
Willow Brook, Missouri, an unincorporated community
Willow Brook (Utley Brook tributary), Pennsylvania, United States

See also
Willowbrook (disambiguation)